Ingvar Skogsberg (born 16 January 1937) is a Swedish film director and screenwriter.

Selected filmography
 City of My Dreams (1976)
 Legenden om Svarta Björn (The Legend of Svarta Björn) (1979)

References

External links

1937 births
Living people
Swedish film directors
Swedish screenwriters
Swedish male screenwriters
People from Valdemarsvik Municipality